Nazri bin Ngah is a Malaysian politician and has served as Pahang State Executive Councillor.

Election Results

Honours
  :
  Knight Companion of the Order of the Crown of Pahang (DIMP) - Dato' (2008)
  Knight Companion of the Order of Sultan Ahmad Shah of Pahang (DSAP) - Dato' (2011)

References

Living people
People from Pahang
Malaysian people of Malay descent
Malaysian Muslims
United Malays National Organisation politicians
Members of the Pahang State Legislative Assembly
Pahang state executive councillors
21st-century Malaysian politicians
Year of birth missing (living people)